The Danu people are a government-recognized ethnic group in Myanmar, predominantly populating the areas near the Pindaya Caves in Shan State. They speak the Danu language.

Etymology 
The name Danu derives from the Pali term dhanu, which means "archer" or "bow." The term dhanu is a reference to the legend of Prince Kummabhaya, whose bow and arrow rescued seven princesses trapped in the caves by a giant spider.

Notable Danu people 

 Aung Myat - former Chief Minister of Shan State

References 

Ethnic groups in Myanmar

Buddhist communities of Bangladesh 
Buddhist communities of Myanmar
Sino-Tibetan-speaking people